Proyecto Dos (Eng: Project Two) is a 2008 Spanish action/thriller film and the feature debut of television director Guillermo Fernandez Groizard.  The film had its festival premiere on April 8, 2008 at the Malaga Spanish Film Festival, and its theatrical debut on April 25, 2008.

Production
The film's working title was Laberinto de espejos.  The director stated that the casting process was tedious, but that they had the freedom to rewrite portions of the film as suitable actors were found, to better match character to actors.  The production was shot on locations in Argentina, London, and Madrid.  The film went to festivals in Europe under the English language title of Project Two, and was released on DVD in 2009 under the German title Projekt 2.  It is screening in 2010 under the shorter title Dos.

Synopsis
Diego leads a pleasant and ordinary life. One night on TV, he sees a man identical to himself get killed in a road accident in Argentina. From then on he begins to realise that nothing is what he thought: not his parents, not his wife... not even himself.

Cast

Reception
Público found the visual style and pace of the film pleasing, while Soitu found it a rare example of an action and special effects drama from Spanish cinema, usually only seen in Hollywood productions. Marcus Littwin of Die-besten-Horrorfilme praised the film and its director, noting that the story quickly draws in the audience, and was impressed with the stunning images and exciting action and twists.

Conversely, Carmen Porschen of Movie Maze found the film started well, but had major flaws, finding that the strong opening soon dilutes into an unoriginal story consistent with an average television movie.

Recognition

Awards and nominations
 2008, nominated for Golden Biznaga at The Malaga Spanish Film Festival

See also 
 List of Spanish films of 2008

References

External links
 Proyecto Dos at the Internet Movie Database

2008 films
2008 action thriller films
Spanish action thriller films
2000s Spanish-language films
2000s Spanish films
Films shot in Madrid